Pivovar Broumov is a traditional brewery in Broumov in the eastern Czech Republic. It produces a light beer for domestic consumption and a dark beer for the export to Germany.

See also 
List of oldest companies

References

External links 
Homepage

Beer in the Czech Republic
Companies established in the 14th century
14th-century establishments in Europe
Czech brands